The Croton Aqueduct Gate House is located in Manhattanville, Manhattan, New York City, New York. The building was built in 1884 and was added to the National Register of Historic Places on September 22, 1983. After being decommissioned in 1984, the below-grade valve chambers were filled and the building sat empty for nearly two decades. Between 2004 and 2006, architects  oversaw an adaptive reuse project converting the gate house into theater space for Harlem Stage/Aaron Davis Hall.

See also
National Register of Historic Places listings in Manhattan above 110th Street
List of New York City Designated Landmarks in Manhattan above 110th Street

References

Industrial buildings and structures in Manhattan
Water infrastructure of New York City
Water supply infrastructure on the National Register of Historic Places
Buildings and structures on the National Register of Historic Places in Manhattan
National Register of Historic Places in New York City
Industrial buildings and structures on the National Register of Historic Places in New York City
Infrastructure completed in 1884
Theatres in Manhattan
New York City Designated Landmarks in Manhattan